Marcelo Canales (born 6 January 1991), is a Honduran professional footballer who most recently played as a midfielder for F.C. Motagua.

References

External links

1991 births
Living people
Honduran footballers
Honduras international footballers
Association football midfielders
C.D.S. Vida players
C.D. Olimpia players
F.C. Motagua players
Liga Nacional de Fútbol Profesional de Honduras players